Wakesurfing is a water sport in which a rider trails behind a boat, riding the boat's wake without being directly pulled by the boat. After getting up on the wake, typically by use of a tow rope, the wakesurfers will drop the rope, and ride the steep face below the wave's peak in a fashion reminiscent of surfing. Wakesurfers generally use special boards, designed specifically for wakes.

History
The origins of wakesurfing are somewhat disputed with multiple people and companies claiming to be at the genesis of the sport. Some claims have set the dates for the origins of boat-surfing or wake-surfing as far back as the 1920s. However, no credible evidence of this is available. Footage and print media from the 1950s and 1960s show ocean surfers actively riding surfboards behind motor boats. By the mid 60's numerous surfboard manufacturers laid claims to building wake specific boards.

The practice of riding surfboards behind boats continued through the 70s and 80s with the boards being ridden evolving to shorter forms right along the shortboard revolution in Surfing. As boards progressively shortened in length, taking a page from windsurfing or sailboarding many practitioners started using devices mounted to the board to strap and secure their feet in place. Aided with a tow rope, hard carving and launching off wakes lead to sports like skurfing, skiboarding, and eventually wakeboarding.

Wakeboarding's growth and mass appeal led the watercraft industry to advance technology to increase the size of wakes. This, in turn, provided an opportunity for wakesurfing to emerge from the shadows. Several sport pioneers, including, but not limited to Tim Lopes, Jerry Price, Jeff Page, Rick Lee, and others are noted with being at the forefront of modern wakesurfing. The first US design patent for a wakesurf was granted to Alfonso Corona in 1997.

Dangers
With the rise of wakesurfing in recent years many individuals have attempted surfing behind boats ill-equipped to wakesurf. Boats with outboard motors or sterndrive propulsion are not suited for wake surfing and lead to heighted risk, possible maiming or even death. The only types of boats safe to surf behind are direct drive or V-drive boats, this is because the propeller is located far beneath the boat rather than behind the boat.

Another risk associated with ill-equipped boats is Carbon Monoxide Poisoning. Boats designed for wake surfing direct the boat exhaust downward into the propeller stream, pushing the exhaust far away from the rider.

Boat setup
Inboard ski or wakeboard boats are the most popular choice for this sport as the propeller is under the boat, and is less likely to make contact with the rider. Owners of inboard boats place ballast, such as water, lead weights, concrete, or other heavy objects in different sections of the boat in order to weight the boat down and create a larger wake. The best weight configuration for wakesurfing is to place the majority of the weight near the back corner side the surfer is surfing on. The deeper the boat is in the water, the bigger the wake will be overall. In addition, one will want to place a larger amount at the stern of the boat on the side which the rider is riding. This will ramp the wake up on the side the rider is riding and washout the opposite side. A rope length of 8 to 10 feet is recommended. Wakesurf-intended ropes are generally 20 feet long, making it ideal for boats that have a tower set-up. Long ski and wakeboard ropes can become hazardous for wakesurfing, because it usually involves winding up the rope or tying unnecessary knots.

Notable wakesurfers

 Ashley Kidd, winner of the 2014 and 2015 World Wake Surf Championships (pro women's division)
 Jake Caster, winner of the 2017 World Wake Surf Championships (pro men's skim division), runner-up 2018 World Wake Surf Championships (pro men's skim division) and placed 3rd in 2019 World Wake Surf Championships (pro men's surf division)
Connor Burns, 2019 & 2018 World Champion Pro Men’s wake surfer; 2017 World Champion Amateur Men’s wake surfer.
Drew Danielo, 7X World Champion and recipient of the Legend Award at the 2019 World Championships.
Local legend Gunnar Dudlar, often known to be "better with a board than with a sail."

Trick list
Many riders perform a wide array of maneuvers or specifically named 'tricks' while wakesurfing, with most owing their origins to surfing, skating (both vert and street) and snowboarding,  Some of the most well-known tricks are:

 Pumping – Turning up and down the face of the wake to gain speed.
 Stalling – Applying pressure to the back foot to slow down or “stall”.
 Floater – When a rider and board “floats” on top of the wake.
 Lip slide – Just like a floater, but the board is sideways.
 Spray – Gouging into the face of the wake to create the water under the rider to explode and spray.
 Fire hydrant – Placing one hand on the board and taking the front foot off.
 Posing – Doing hand and body positions while riding for cool style points.
 Hang 5 – Rider extends front foot (toes) over front of board.
 Rail grabs – Grabbing the board’s rail while the board is on the wake – one or both hands.
 Cutbacks – Bashing off the lip of the wake with the board – the more extreme and risky the better.
 Paddle back in – Going to the extreme rear of the wake, throwing down on the board and paddling back into the power zone. This can also be done by pulling the outside rail of the board to bring it back to the power zone.
 Tubing it – Throwing down on the board and sliding back into the tube until covered up – the deeper the better, and then popping out and standing back up on the board.
 Switch stance – Riding with the opposite foot forward.
 Airs – Launching off the lip with board into the air and landing back on the wake (toeside or heelside).
 One-hand grab air – Grabbing one rail of the board while the board is airborne above the wake.
 Double Grab Air – Grabbing both rails of the board while the board is airborne above the wake.
 Hang 10 – Rider extends both feet (toes) over end of board.
180 spin – Spinning 180 on the wake – Board and rider spin.
 360 spin – Spinning 360 on the face of the wake – Board and rider spin.
 540 spin – Rider spins continuously 1 1/2 times until they are riding switch stance forward.
 720 spin – Rider spins continuously 2 complete 360′s.
900 spin – Rider spins continuously 2 1/2 times until they are riding switch stance forward.
 Air 180 – Doing an air while spinning 180 the blind direction.
 180 air  - Doing and air and spinning a 180 in the air and landing in with a switch stance.
Body varial – Rider does an air and rotates 180º before landing back on the board. The board doesn't spin at all during this trick.
 180 shove it – Spinning just the board 180 under the rider's feet and landing with the board “backwards”.
 360 shove it – Same as a 180 but you spin the board a full 360 under your feet. Note: rider does not spin only the board spins.
540 shove it – Rider does and air and uses his/her feet to spin the board a full 540º before landing back on the board.
 Big Spin – Same as a 360 shove-it, only the rider spins a 180 at the same time the board does a 360.

In popular culture
In 2013, Canadian musician Chris Hau recorded a video in which he plays a song on an acoustic guitar while wakesurfing.

In February 2015, Hunter Sims, a professional wakesurfer, received a world record for doing 106 shove-its.

Many celebrities have taken up the sport with P!nk, Julianne Hough, and Gus Kenworthy among the ones spending their summers trying the activity.

World Champion Skimboarder Austin Keen launched an interview series with celebrities wakesurfing in 2020. His first guest was Diplo.

References

External links

 Competitive Wake Surf Association
 World Wake Surf Championship
 www.prowakesurfer.com

Boardsports
Sports originating in Australia
Towed water sports
Articles containing video clips
Surfing